"King for a Day" is a song by the English rock band XTC, released on their 1989 album Oranges & Lemons. Written by Colin Moulding, it was the second single from the album and reached number 82 on the UK Singles Chart. The music video featured a cameo appearance from guitarist Dave Gregory's brother Ian, drummer of the Dukes of Stratosphear. Their performance of the song on Late Night with David Letterman marked the first time XTC had performed live in seven years.

Personnel
XTC
Dave Gregory
Colin Moulding
Andy Partridge
Pat Mastelotto

Charts

References

External links
"King for a Day" on Chalkhills

XTC songs
1989 singles
1989 songs
Virgin Records singles
Songs written by Colin Moulding
Black-and-white music videos